Arthrochilus oreophilus, commonly known as montane elbow orchid, is a flowering plant in the orchid family (Orchidaceae) and is endemic to higher places in far north Queensland. It has a rosette of leaves at its base and up to fifteen green, insect-like flowers with dark reddish brown glands on its labellum.

Description
Arthrochilus oreophilus is a terrestrial, perennial, deciduous, sympodial herb with an underground tuber that produces daughter tubers on the end of root-like stolons.
Flowering occurs from November to January.

Taxonomy and naming
Arthrochilus oreophilus was first formally described in 1991 by David Jones from a specimen collected near Herberton. The description was published in Australian Orchid Research. The specific epithet (oreophilus) is derived from the Ancient Greek words oros meaning "mountain" or "hill" and philos meaning "beloved" or "dear", referring to the habitat preference of this orchid.

Distribution and habitat
The montane elbow orchid grows in woodland in forest on the ranges and tablelands at altitudes above  between the Cedar Bay National Park and the Evelyn Tableland. It is most common on the Atherton Tableland.

Ecology
As with other Arthrochilus orchids, A. oreophilus is pollinated by male thynnid wasps of the genus Arthrothynnus although the species involved is not known. It also reproduces asexually by producing new tubers.

References 

oreophilus
Plants described in 1991
Orchids of Queensland